Bala Khanlu (also Romanized as Bālā Khānlū) is a village in Sagezabad Rural District, in the Central District of Buin Zahra County, Qazvin Province, Iran. At the 2006 census, its population was 32, in 7 families.

References 

Populated places in Buin Zahra County